The Federal Writers' Project (FWP) was a federal government project in the United States created to provide jobs for out-of-work writers during the Great Depression. It was part of the Works Progress Administration (WPA), a New Deal program. It was one of a group of New Deal arts programs known collectively as Federal Project Number One or Federal One. The FWP employed thousands of people and produced hundreds of publications, including state guides, city guides, local histories, oral histories, ethnographies, and children's books. In addition to writers, the project provided jobs to unemployed librarians, clerks, researchers, editors, and historians.

Background
Funded under the Emergency Relief Appropriation Act of 1935, the FWP was established July 27, 1935, by President Franklin Delano Roosevelt. Henry Alsberg, a journalist, playwright, theatrical producer, and human-rights activist, directed the program from 1935 to 1939. In 1939, Alsberg was fired, federal funding was cut, and the project fell under state sponsorship led by John D. Newsom. The FWP ended completely in 1943.

An estimated 10,000 people found employment in the FWP.  The project set out not only to provide work relief for unemployed writers, but also to create a unique "self-portrait of America" through publication of guidebooks. From 1935 to 1943, the project cost about $27,000,000 – 0.002% of all WPA appropriations.

American Guide Series and other publications 

The American Guide Series, the most well-known of the FWP's publications, consisted of guides to the then 48 states, as well as the Alaska Territory, Puerto Rico, and Washington, DC. The books were written and compiled by writers from individual states and territories, and edited by Alsberg and his staff in Washington, DC. The format was generally uniform, and each guide included detailed histories of the state or territory, with descriptions of every city and town, automobile travel routes, photographs, maps, and chapters on natural resources, culture, and geography. The inclusion of essays about the various cultures of people living in the states, including immigrants and African Americans, was unprecedented. City books, such as The New York City Guide, were also published as part of the series. Some full-length books are available online at the Internet Archive.  The FWP also published another series, Life In America, and numerous individual titles.  Many FWP books were bestsellers, including American Hurricane, a rapidly produced volume about the devastation wreaked by the 1938 New England hurricane. Others, such as Cape Cod Pilot, written by author Josef Berger using the pseudonym Jeremiah Digges, received critical acclaim.

In each state, a Writers' Project non-relief staff of editors was formed, along with a much larger group of field workers drawn from local unemployment rolls. The people hired came from a variety of backgrounds, ranging from former newspaper workers to white-collar and blue-collar workers without writing or editing experience.

Ancillary projects 
Notable projects of the FWP included the Slave Narrative Collection, a set of interviews that culminated in over 2,300 first-person accounts of slavery and 500 black-and-white photographs of former slaves. Many of these narratives are available online from the above-named collection at the Library of Congress website. Folklorist Benjamin A. Botkin was instrumental in insuring the survival of these manuscripts. Among the researchers and authors who have used this collection are Colson Whitehead for his Pulitzer Prize-winning novel, The Underground Railroad.

Other programs that emerged from Alsberg's desire to create an inclusive "self-portrait of America" were the Life History and Folklore projects. These consisted of first-person narratives and interviews (collected and conducted by FWP workers), which represented people of various ethnicities, regions, and occupations. According to the Library of Congress website, American Life Histories: Manuscripts from the Federal Writers' Project, 1936 to 1940, the documents "chronicle vivid life stories of Americans who lived at the turn of the century and include tales of meeting Billy the Kid, surviving the 1871 Chicago fire, pioneer journeys out West, grueling factory work, and the immigrant experience. Writers hired by this Depression-era work project included Ralph Ellison, Nelson Algren, May Swenson, and many others."

The Illinois Writers' Project, represented one of the few racially integrated project sites. The Chicago project employed Arna Bontemps, an established voice of the Harlem Renaissance, and helped to launch the literary careers of African-American writers such as Richard Wright, Margaret Walker, Katherine Dunham, and Frank Yerby. The Virginia Negro Studies Project employed 16 African American writers and culminated in the publication of The Negro in Virginia (1940). Notably, it included photographs by Robert McNeill, now remembered as a groundbreaking African American photographer. The unpublished works of African American writer Zora Neale Hurston, who was employed by the Florida Writers' Project, was compiled years after her death in Go Gator and Muddy the Water: Writings by Zora Neale Hurston from the Federal Writers' Project.

A short lived project of the FWP was the America Eats project, which was a proposed book of the regional foodways of the United States. Each state was tasked with gathering information about foods and food-related events unique to their area, and subsequently preparing essays. The country was divided into five regions: the Northeast, the South, the Middle West, the Far West, and the Southwest. While materials, in various quantities, were gathered from all five regions, the book America Eats! was never completed and published due to the entry of the United States into World War II and the subsequent loss of funding for the FWP and its projects. Materials from the America Eats project are held in various archives and libraries around the country, including at the Library of Congress and the Montana State University Archives and Special Collections. A large digital archive called What America Ate has been created to house the digitized remains of the project.

Controversies 
For most of its lifetime, the FWP faced a barrage of criticism from conservatives. When Massachusetts: A Guide to its Places and People, was published, it was lauded by government officials, including Governor Charles F. Hurley, but the day after its publication, "conservatives attacked the book over its essays on the 1912 Lawrence textile strike and other labor issues. Even more sacrilegious to these critics was the coverage of the Sacco and Vanzetti affair." Scholars called the questionable passages "fair accounts"; ironically, the controversy helped increase book sales.

The most poisonous attacks against the FWP came from the House Un-American Activities Committee (HUAC) and its chair,  media-savvy Congressman Martin Dies Jr. of Texas. Alsberg and Hallie Flanagan, his counterpart at the Federal Theatre Project, faced tremendous scrutiny from the committee. The Dies HUAC committee, like the McCarthy committee of the 1950s, "used inquisitorial scare tactics, innuendo, and unsupported accusations."  Alsberg, Flanagan, and others who were accused of supporting the communist agenda could not  "examine evidence against them, could not produce their own witnesses, could not cross-examine accusers."  Accusations that communist activities were carried out openly, and that Soviets funded labor unions, which then took control of the arts' projects, were found to be false. Future Guggenheim scholar and author Richard Wright was often under attack, with his writings pronounced as "vile." Among the many charges leveled against the FWP and its members, was that Richard Wright was not born in the United States. (He was born in Mississippi.) Alsberg wrote a long court brief and provided supporting documents to refute each charge.

Support for the FWP came from Eleanor Roosevelt, as well as mainstream publishing companies such as Viking Press, Random House, and Alfred A. Knopf, which produced some of the books.

By 1939, HUAC's tactics seemed to work, and the newly-elected Congress cut the WPA budget while increasing HUAC's funding. In January 1939, 6,000 people were laid off from Federal One. By July 1939, Congress voted to eliminate the Theatre Project. Federal sponsorship for the Federal Writers' Project came to an end in 1939, although the program was permitted to continue under state sponsorship, with some federal employees, until 1943. In the last months of the FWP's existence, Henry Alsberg was fired. He continued to work past his firing date to meet contractual arrangements with the publishers of three upcoming American Guide books. By the time of his departure in 1939, the FWP had published 321 publications; hundreds more remained in various stages of publications. Some were published in the years leading up to 1943 under the renamed Writers' Program. Others were never completed. Over the lifetime of the FWP and the Writers' Program,  10,000 people were estimated to be employed.

In the 1937 musical The Cradle Will Rock, funded by the Federal Theater Project, composer Marc Blitzstein incorporated into the work the efforts to prevent its production.

Film
A National Endowment for the Humanities-funded documentary about the FWP titled Soul of a People: Writing America's Story premiered on the Smithsonian Channel in September 2009. The film includes interviews with American authors Studs Terkel and Stetson Kennedy, and American historian Douglas Brinkley. The companion book was published by Wiley & Sons as Soul of a People: The WPA Writers' Project Uncovers Depression America.

The Slave Narrative Collection featured in the HBO documentary, Unchained Memories: Readings from the Slave Narratives and includes Angela Bassett and Samuel L. Jackson performing dramatic readings of the transcripts.

The 1999 film Cradle Will Rock, by Tim Robbins, while depicting the events of the Federal Theatre Project (FTP), dramatizes the attacks against Federal One (via the HUAC), which helped shutter both the FTP and the FWP.

Proposal for a new Federal Writers' Project 
In the wake of the 2020 COVID-19 pandemic and consequent global economic disruption, several writers and politicians called for a new U.S. Federal Writers’ Project.  In May 2021, on the anniversary of the original project, Congressman Ted Lieu and Congresswoman Teresa Leger Fernandez introduced legislation to create a new FWP, administered by the Department of Labor, that would hire unemployed and underemployed writers.  Supporters of the legislation included James Fallows, Ruth Dickey, and Jonathan Lethem.

Notable participants

 Conrad Aiken
 Nelson Algren
 William Attaway
 Saul Bellow
 Arna Bontemps
 Benjamin Botkin
 Max Bodenheim
 John Cheever
 Richard Durham
 Arnold S. Eagle
 Loren Eiseley
 Eliot Elisofon
 Ralph Ellison
 Vardis Fisher
 Irving Fishman
 Robert Hayden
 Leon Srabian Herald
 Zora Neale Hurston
 Weldon Kees
 Stetson Kennedy
 Claude McKay
 Vincent McHugh
 Harry Partch
 Kenneth Patchen
 Kenneth Rexroth
 May Swenson
 Studs Terkel
 Jim Thompson
 Margaret Walker
 Dorothy West
 Walker Winslow
 Richard Wright
 Frank Yerby
 Anzia Yezierska

Gallery

References

Further reading
 Banks, Ann, ed., First-Person America, W.W. Norton, 1991, an anthology of oral history interviews collected by the Federal Writers Project.
 Blakey, George T. Creating a Hoosier Self-Portrait: The Federal Writers' Project in Indiana, 1935–1942 Indiana University Press, 2005.
 Bordelon, Pamela. Zora Neale Hurston: from the Federal Writers’ Project, Go Gator and muddy the water, WW Norton & Company, 1999.
 Brewer, Jeutonne P., The Federal Writers' Project: a bibliography, Metuchen, NH: Scarecrow Press, 1994.
 
 
 Fleischhauer, Carl, and Beverly W. Brannan, eds., Documenting America, 1935–1943, Berkeley: University of California Press, 1988.
 Hirsch, Jerrold. Portrait of America: A Cultural History of the Federal Writers' Project (2003)
 Kelly, Andrew. Kentucky by Design: The Decorative Arts and American Culture. Lexington: University Press of Kentucky. 2015.  
 Kurlansky, Mark, The Food of a Younger Land, Penguin, NY, 2009.
 Mangione, Jerre, The Dream and the Deal: the Federal Writers' Project, 1935–1943, Boston: Little, Brown, 1972.
 
 Meltzer, Milton, Violins & shovels: the WPA arts projects, New York: Delacorte Press, 1976.
 Penkower, Monty Noam, The Federal Writers' Project: A Study in Government Patronage of the Arts, Urbana, Illinois: University of Illinois Press, 1976.
 Rubenstein DeMasi, Susan. Henry Alsberg: The Driving Force of the New Deal Federal Writers' Project, McFarland & Co., 2016.
 Taylor, David A., Soul of a People: The WPA Writers' Project Uncovers Depression America, Hoboken, New Jersey: Wiley & Sons, 2009.

External links

Overview
U.S. Senate: The American Guide Series (.pdf) Bibliographic overview of the guides.
U.S. Works Projects Administration  (American Guide Series) eBooks: 20th-Century US History: Federal Writers' Project Books (mostly Travel). Links to over 100 free full-text guides.

Specific projects
Exhibit by the Library of Congress of recordings, documents, and essays by the Federal Writer's Project for Florida Folklife
Federal Writer's Project by Petra Schindler-Carter
The Living New Deal.
The Negro in Virginia
Manuscripts from the Federal Writers' Project, 1936–1940, Library of Congress: American Life Histories
Federal Writers' Project in Nebraska, Lincoln Libraries
Nebraska: A Guide to the Cornhusker State (1939) Online full-text PDF edition. (Access restricted.)
 Almanac for New Yorkers, 1938
 Guide to the Old Dominion, Full hypertext of the WPA guide to Virginia with maps, tours, and critical essays on Virginia and the WPA in the Depression
New Deal Network: The Great Depression, the 1930s, and the Roosevelt Administration
1939 Federal Writer's Project: Exhibit on the Conchs of Florida, Online version, State Archives of Florida
 Powell, Lawrence N. "Lyle Saxon and the WPA Guide to New Orleans," Southern Spaces 29 July 2009.
 "Federal Writers' Project", Encyclopedia of Oklahoma History and Culture

Florida Negro Papers at the University of South Florida (9 boxes, not digitized)
 The Marcus Christian Collection in the Louisiana Digital Library.
 WPA Federal Writers' Project Materials on African-American Life in South Carolina
 New Orleans City Guide (1938) at the Internet Archive
 Guide to the Federal Writers' Project Kentucky: A Guide to the Bluegrass manuscript, 1939 housed at the University of Kentucky Libraries Special Collections Research Center
What America Ate, housed digitally by Michigan State University
WPA Collection at Montana State University Archives and Special Collections

New Deal projects of the arts
New Deal agencies
Works Progress Administration
American writers' organizations
Arts organizations established in 1935
1935 establishments in the United States
Oral history
Federal Writers' Project